Vendel Endrédy O.Cist. (January 19, 1895 in Fertőendréd, Hungary, died December 29, 1981 in Pannonhalma) was a Hungarian monk, and the abbot of Zirc, Pilis-Paszto and St. Gotthard abbeys and Abbot President of the Zirc Congregation 1939–1981.

Life

He was the fourth of ten children and grew up in a farming family in the Hungarian county of Győr-Moson-Sopron. He attended a school run by Benedictines in Győr and received the Cistercian habit at Zirc Abbey in 1917.

Endrédy studied Theology, Mathematics and Physics; after receiving his teaching certificate in 1922 he became a teacher at the Cistercian school in Budapest. In 1938 he became principal and a year later, in 1939, he was elected abbot of Zirc. During the war the monastery and its schools suffered severe losses and in 1948 the Communist regime took over all five of the abbey's schools. Endrédy fled to Rome in November 1948 but soon returned to Hungary, fully aware that he would be incarcerated by the Communists. Upon his return, he brought a message from Pope Pius XII to Kardinal Mindszenty, who had been placed under house arrest on December 26, 1948.

On October 25, 1950, after not only the Cistercians' schools but also their monasteries had gone into Communist hands, Abbot Vendel was the last to leave his monastery and was arrested four days later in Budapest. Torture followed, and in 1951 Endrédy was sentenced to 14 years in prison. Six years he spent in isolation. In 1957 he was transferred to a home for aged clerics in Pannonhalma, where he died in 1981. His requiem took place in Pannonhalma Archabbey, his grave is in the  Abbey Church at Zirc.

Bibliography
 Wendelin Endrédy: Prison Memoirs, in: Thomas Pruit (ed.), Cistercians in Texas, the 1998 Jubilee (Dallas 1998), p. 114-129.
 Kálmán Kulcsár: Systemwechsel in Ungarn 1988–1990. – Frankfurt : Vittorio Klostermann, 1997 – p. 289
 Agnes Timár (ed.): Wege und Irrwege der katholischen Kirche Ungarns in der Zeit der Verfolgung durch die Kommunisten. – Berlin : Pro Business, 2009
 Endrédy Vendel Kálmán, in: Magyar Katolikus Lexikon
 Endrédy Kálmán Vendel, Hadarits, in: Magyar Életrajzi Lexikon 1000–1990

References

External links
 Biographical article on Biographia Cisterciensis

1895 births
1981 deaths
Hungarian Cistercians
Hungarian abbots
Soviet show trials
Hungarian refugees
Prisoners and detainees of Hungary
Hungarian prisoners and detainees